Smith Lake is a lake in the U.S. state of Washington.

Smith Lake was named after Jacob Smith, a pioneer settler of the 1850s.

References

Lakes of Thurston County, Washington